Choudhary Ishwar Singh Jadaula (born 10 April 1950, Jadaula, Kaithal district, Haryana) is a politician from Indian Congress in Haryana state of India. He was a member of Rajya Sabha from Haryana during 2008-2014. He is also an elected Vidhan sabha member from Guhla Cheeka.

He lives at Kurukshetra in the Haryana.

References

Rajya Sabha members from Haryana
1950 births
People from Kaithal district
Living people
Indian National Congress politicians